The Great House is a 1975 Spanish drama film directed by Francisco Rodríguez Fernández. It was entered into the 25th Berlin International Film Festival.

Cast
 Manuel Ayuso
 Antonio Cuenca
 Juan Diego
 Antonio Ferrandis
 Antonio Gamero
 Adolfo López
 Maribel Martín
 Francisco Merino
 Enrique Navarro
 Luis Rico
 María Sánchez Aroca
 Fernando Sánchez Polack
 Adolfo Thous
 Julia Trujillo

References

External links

1975 films
1970s Spanish-language films
1975 drama films
Spanish drama films
1970s Spanish films